Oakland City may refer to:
Oakland City (Atlanta), a neighborhood in Atlanta, Georgia
Oakland City (MARTA station)
Oakland City, Indiana
Oakland City University, a four-year college located in Oakland City, Indiana
Oakland, California